"Notorious" is the fourteenth single by the English new wave band Duran Duran. It was released internationally by EMI on 20 October 1986. "Notorious" was the first single issued from Duran Duran's fourth album Notorious (1986), and the first released by Duran Duran as a 3-piece band after the departure of Roger Taylor and Andy Taylor. It was a commercial success worldwide, reaching number seven on the UK Singles Chart and number two on the US Billboard Hot 100, and was a success in various other countries.

About the song
"Notorious" marked the debut of the new streamlined trio version of Duran Duran, as Andy Taylor and Roger Taylor had left the band by the time the album was released. As a trio, the band had enlisted the help of Nile Rodgers to take over production duties. His funk influences can be heard throughout the single - for example, the tempo and the use of The Borneo Horns brass section. Rodgers also played the guitar on the single.

Reception
Billboard called it "Anglo-funk, sharp, tidy, made for dancing."

Music video
The video for "Notorious" was shot on 23 September 1986 by directors Peter Kagan and Paula Greif, and bore an uncanny resemblance to the video the duo had filmed in June of that year for Steve Winwood's "Higher Love".  The video was shot in black and white Super-8 with a hand-held camera, with quick cuts and changes of zoom and focus, a style that Kagan and Greif also used for the video to Scritti Politti's "Perfect Way". It featured the three-piece band performing the song on a sound stage, with scantily clad dancers in the background choreographed by Paula Abdul.

The young model Christy Turlington appeared in outdoor scenes with the band.  A still photo from this location was used as the cover of the album Notorious.

B-side and official remixes
For the first time, the B-side to the 7" single was not an original recording; "Winter Marches On" was an unaltered version of the Notorious album track. Before this, Duran Duran had always provided either completely original songs or previously unheard remixes on the B-side.

As a first for the band, "Notorious" was released as two separate 12" singles. The first had a Nile Rodgers produced "Extended Mix" while the second featured a remix by The Latin Rascals.

There are 3 official mixes of "Notorious":
Notorious (45 Mix) - 3:58 (Album Version, with a slightly edited middle 8 and outro)
Notorious (Extended Mix) - 5:14 (Album Version, with a one-minute dub intro added on)
Notorious (The Latin Rascals Mix) - 6:23 (Basically the Album Version, with a 1:10 dub intro and two brief remixed interludes spliced in)

and 1 DJ Remix 

Disconet Remix 6:33 – 1:30 dub intro, with the rest of the song more comprehensively remixed and rearranged; in particular, the guitars and percussion are accentuated.
This version is available on the "Disconet Dance Classics Volume 3" CD.

As a perennially popular song in their back catalogue, "Notorious" appears in various Duran Duran megamixes, most notably:
"Notoriousaurus Rex (Master Mix)"
"Burning the Ground" and its B-side, "Decadance"
"DMC Megamix"

Format and track listing

7": EMI. / DDN 45 United Kingdom
 "Notorious" (45 Mix) - 3:58
 "Winter Marches On" - 3:25

12": EMI. / 12 DDN 45 United Kingdom
 "Notorious" (Extended Mix) - 5:14
 "Notorious" (45 Mix) - 3:58
 "Winter Marches On" - 3:25

 also released on MC in New Zealand (EMI. / TC-GOOD 149)

12": EMI. / 12 DDNX 45 United Kingdom
 "Notorious" (The Latin Rascals Mix) - 6:23
 "Notorious" (45 Mix) - 3:58
 "Winter Marches On" - 3:25

 also released on MC (TC DDNX 45)

7": Capitol Records. / B-5648 United States 
 "Notorious" (45 Mix) - 3:58
 "Winter Marches On" - 3:25

12": Capitol Records. / V-15264 United States 
 "Notorious" (Extended Mix) - 5:14
 "Notorious" (45 Mix) - 3:58
 "Winter Marches On" - 3:25

12": Capitol Records. / V-15266 United States 
 "Notorious" (The Latin Rascals Mix) - 6:23
 "Notorious" (45 Mix) - 3:58
 "Winter Marches On" - 3:25

CD: Part of "Singles Box Set 1986–1995" boxset
 "Notorious" (45 Mix) - 3:58
 "Winter Marches On" - 3:25
 "Notorious" (Extended Mix) - 5:14
 "Notorious" (The Latin Rascals Mix) - 6:23

Charts

Weekly charts

Year-end charts

As of October 2021 "Notorious" is the twelfth most streamed Duran Duran song in the UK.

Credits and personnel
Duran Duran
Simon Le Bon – vocals
John Taylor – bass
Nick Rhodes – keyboards

Additional musicians
Steve Ferrone – drums
Nile Rodgers – guitars
The Borneo Horns – horns
Curtis King – background vocals
Brenda White-King – background vocals
Tessa Niles – background vocals
Cindy Mizelle – background vocals

Production
Nile Rodgers – producer
Duran Duran – producer
Daniel Abraham – engineer and mixer
The Latin Rascals – remixers

References

External links
 TM's Duran Duran Discography

1986 songs
1986 singles
1987 singles
Duran Duran songs
Number-one singles in Italy
Song recordings produced by Nile Rodgers
EMI Records singles
Capitol Records singles
Songs written by Simon Le Bon
Songs written by John Taylor (bass guitarist)
Songs written by Nick Rhodes